John Harry Atkinson (January 19, 1874 – January 2, 1953) was an American professional baseball player who played for the St. Louis Browns in 1895.

Atkinson was born in Fulton, Missouri and attended Westminster College.

External links

1874 births
1953 deaths
19th-century baseball players
Major League Baseball outfielders
St. Louis Browns (NL) players
Baseball players from Missouri
People from Fulton, Missouri